Chaudhary Muhammad Ashraf (born 20 October 1935) is a Pakistani politician who has been a member of the National Assembly of Pakistan, since August 2018. Previously he was a member of the National Assembly from June 2013 to May 2018.

Early life
He was born on 20 October 1935.

Political career
He ran for the seat of the National Assembly of Pakistan as a candidate of Pakistan Muslim League (Q) (PML-Q) from Constituency NA-161 (Sahiwal-II) in 2002 Pakistani general election but was unsuccessful. He received 38,207 votes and lost the seat to Rana Tariq Javed, independent candidate.

He ran for the seat of the National Assembly as a candidate of Pakistan Democratic Party from Constituency NA-161 (Sahiwal-II) in 2008 Pakistani general election but was unsuccessful. He received 33,110 votes and lost the seat to Ghulam Farid Kathia.

He was elected to the National Assembly as a candidate of Pakistan Muslim League (N) (PML-N) from Constituency NA-161 (Sahiwal-II) in 2013 Pakistani general election. He received 94,012 votes and defeated Malik Muhammad Yar Dhakoo, a candidate of Pakistan Tehreek-e-Insaf (PTI).

He was re-elected to the National Assembly as a candidate of PML-N from Constituency NA-148 (Sahiwal-II) in 2018 Pakistani general election.

References

Living people
Pakistan Muslim League (N) MNAs
Punjabi people
Pakistani MNAs 2013–2018
People from Sahiwal District
1935 births
Pakistani MNAs 2018–2023